Giljarovia is a genus of harvestmen in the family Nemastomatidae with 11 described species from the Caucasus region.

Species
There are currently 11 described species in the genus Giljarovia

 Giljarovia crimeana Chemeris & Kovblyuk, 2012  Crimea, Ukraine
 Giljarovia kratochvili Snegovaya, 2011  Krasnodar Krai, Russia
 Giljarovia redikorzevi Charitonov, 1946  Imereti, Georgia
 Giljarovia rossica Kratochvíl, 1958  Krasnodar Krai, Russia
 Giljarovia stridula (Kratochvíl, 1958)  Krasnodar Krai, Russia
 Giljarovia tenebricosa (Redikortsev, 1936)  Krasnodar Krai, Russia to Ganja-Qazakh, Azerbaijan, and Artvin, Turkey
 Giljarovia thoracocornuta Martens, 2006  Dagestan, Russia
 Giljarovia triangula Martens, 2006  Adygea to North Ossetia, Russia, & Mtskheta-Mtianeti, Georgia
 Giljarovia trianguloides Martens, 2006  Adygea & Krasnodar Krai, Russia
 Giljarovia turica Gruber, 1976  Black Sea Region, Turkey
 Giljarovia vestita Martens, 2006  Adygea, Russia to Samegrelo-Zemo Svaneti, Georgia

References

Harvestman genera
Arachnids of Europe